The 1983 Gent–Wevelgem was the 45th edition of the Gent–Wevelgem cycle race and was held on 6 April 1983. The race started in Ghent and finished in Wevelgem. The race was won by Leo van Vliet of the TI–Raleigh team.

General classification

References

Gent–Wevelgem
1983 in road cycling
1983 in Belgian sport
1983 Super Prestige Pernod